Nowe Miasteczko  is a town in Lubusz Voivodeship, Poland, with 2,756 inhabitants (2019).

Notable people
Fritz Lubrich (1888–1971), German composer

Twin towns – sister cities
See twin towns of Gmina Nowe Miasteczko.

References

Cities and towns in Lubusz Voivodeship
Nowa Sól County